Kenny Nims (born March 21, 1987) was a lacrosse player for the Chicago Machine of Major League Lacrosse. He played college lacrosse for the Syracuse Orange. Nims played for the Orange from 2006 to 2009, leading the team to two straight NCAA tournament championships in 2008 and 2009. The Machine selected Nims with the first pick of the 2009 MLL draft.

Statistics

Syracuse University

Major League Lacrosse

References

1987 births
Living people
American lacrosse players
Major League Lacrosse players
Sportspeople from Watertown, New York
Syracuse Orange men's lacrosse players